Loazzolo is a comune (municipality) in the Province of Asti in the Italian region Piedmont (Regione Piemonte), located about  southeast of Turin and about  south of Asti.

Loazzolo borders the following municipalities: Bubbio, Canelli, Cessole, Cossano Belbo, Monastero Bormida, Roccaverano, and Santo Stefano Belbo.

A local wine, Loazzolo, is a two-year aged golden sweet yellow wine is produced in the municipality of Loazzolo with grapes from Moscato vineyards.

References

External links
 Official website

Cities and towns in Piedmont